The 1966–67 Drexel Dragons men's basketball team represented Drexel Institute of Technology during the 1966–67 men's basketball season. The Dragons, led by 15th year head coach Samuel Cozen, played their home games at Sayre High School and were members of the College–Southern division of the Middle Atlantic Conferences (MAC).

The team finished the regular season 13–10, and finished in 1st place in the MAC in the regular season.

Roster

Schedule

|-
!colspan=9 style="background:#F8B800; color:#002663;"| Regular season
|-

|-
!colspan=9 style="background:#F8B800; color:#002663;"| 1967 Middle Atlantic Conference men's basketball tournament

|-
!colspan=9 style="background:#F8B800; color:#002663;"| 1967 NCAA College Division basketball tournament

Awards
Joe Hertrich
Academic All-American
MAC Southern Division Most Valuable Player
MAC All-Star Team
Eastern College Athletic Association Division III Seasonal All-Star Team
Philadelphia Basketball Writers Association All-Area College Team

Bill Murphy
Eastern College Athletic Conference All-East Division III Team
Philadelphia Basketball Writers Association "Unsung Hero" of the Week

References

Drexel Dragons men's basketball seasons
Drexel
1966 in sports in Pennsylvania
1967 in sports in Pennsylvania